Gollapalli is a village in Eluru district of the Indian state of Andhra Pradesh. It is located in Nuzvid mandal under Nuzvid revenue division.

Notable people
 

N. S. Prasad (born 1944), scientist, philosopher and author

References 

Villages in Eluru district